The Treaty of Bergerac was signed at Bergerac on 14 September 1577 between Henry III of France and Huguenot princes, and later ratified by the Edict of Poitiers on 17 September. This accord was developed after the sixth phase of the French Wars of Religion. The treaty replaced the Edict of Beaulieu, which was deemed by the Catholic League as too favorable to Protestants. Based on the terms of the treaty, Huguenots were only allowed to practice their faith in the suburbs of one town in each judicial district. In Vivarais, the treaty was recognized in late October 1577.

See also
List of treaties

Notes

References
Salmon, J. H. M. Peasant Revolt in Vivarais, 1575-1580. French Historical Studies, Vol. 11, No. 1, (Spring 1979). Duke University Press.
Knecht, R. J. The French Civil Wars (2000) Pearson Education Limited.

External links
Encyclopædia Britannica – Bergerac
Third French War of Religion
The Columbia Encyclopedia: Poitiers

French Wars of Religion
1577 in France
Bergerac
1577 treaties